HMS Oracle was an  submarine of the Royal Navy.

Design and construction

The Oberon class was a direct follow on of the Porpoise-class, with the same dimensions and external design, but updates to equipment and internal fittings, and a higher grade of steel used for fabrication of the pressure hull.

Displacement was 1,610 tons standard, 2,030 tons full load when surfaced, and 2,410 tons full load when submerged. Propulsion machinery consisted of 2 Admiralty Standard Range 16 VMS diesel generators, and two  electric motors, each driving a  3-bladed propeller at up to 400 rpm. Eight  diameter torpedo tubes were fitted (six facing forward, two aft), with a total payload of 24 torpedoes. The boats were fitted with Type 186 and Type 187 sonars, and an I-band surface search radar. The standard complement was 68: 6 officers, 62 sailors.

Oracle was laid down by Cammell Laird on 26 April 1960, and launched on 26 September 1961. The boat was commissioned into the Royal Navy on 14 February 1963.

Operational history

Oracle performed three-month secret 'observation' missions in the Arctic region in 1965 during the Cold War period and was on stand-by duty during the tumultuous period when Rhodesia announced independence.

Oracle attended the 1977 Silver Jubilee Fleet Review off Spithead when she was part of the Submarine Flotilla.

Oracle featured in the 1980s BBC documentary series Submarine as she was host to Perisher trainee submarine commanders.

Decommissioning and fate
Oracle was paid off on 18 September 1993.

References

Publications
 

 

Oberon-class submarines of the Royal Navy
Ships built on the River Mersey
1961 ships
Cold War submarines of the United Kingdom